Eichwalde is a municipality of the Dahme-Spreewald district in Brandenburg, Germany, situated at the southeastern Berlin city limits. With 2.8 km² (1.1 sq mi) it is the smallest Brandenburg municipality by area, while its population density is the second highest (after Glienicke/Nordbahn).

Demography

History
The land settlement of Eichwalde was founded on March 20, 1893. The name means "oak wood" in German.

Culture

Museen
The Old Firestation is a cultural center of the town. In the building many concerts, exhibitions, readings and other cultural events are organized by the local Freundeskreis Alte Feuerwache e.V. (Circle of friends of the Old Fire Station) take place.

Music
The last remaining Parabrahm pipe organ (constructed in 1908) of the world

Buildings
Center of Eichwalde with an impressive ensemble of buildings from the time of the founding of Eichwalde, for example the Humboldt-Gymnasium (Humboldt High School) and the Alte Feuerwache (Old Fire Station)
Churches: Catholic (St. Anthony, neo-Roman style), Protestant/Lutheran (neo-Gothic style), Methodist (Eben Ezer), New Apostolic, Landeskirchliche Gemeinschaft
Water tower

Monuments of nature
Friedenseiche (Oak of Peace) => Symbol of the Town

Videogames 
Overwatch Based the name of one of their maps named "Eichenwalde" on this city. It's the hometown of the game's German hero, Reinhardt

Economy and Infrastructure

Traffic
Public transport: Berlin S-Bahn Station Eichwalde
Airport: Berlin-Schönefeld International Airport

Notable people
Sonja Ziemann, actress

References

External links
Homepage of Eichwalde
http://www.eichwalde.com

Localities in Dahme-Spreewald
Teltow (region)